Wonderful World or What a Wonderful World may refer to:

Music

Albums
 A Wonderful World (Tony Bennett & k.d. lang album)
 A Wonderful World (Susan Boyle album)
 Wonderful World (Eva Cassidy album)
 Wonderful World (Israel Kamakawiwo'ole album)
 Wonderful World! (The Kelly Family album), an album by The Kelly Family
 What a Wonderful World (Anne Murray album)
 What a Wonderful World (Willie Nelson album)
 What a Wonderful World (LeAnn Rimes album)
 What a Wonderful World (Louis Armstrong album), an album by Louis Armstrong
 Wonderful World (Telex album), an album by Telex

Songs
 "What a Wonderful World", a song by Louis Armstrong
 "Wonderful World" (Sam Cooke song), a song covered by Herman's Hermits
"Somewhere over the Rainbow/What a Wonderful World", a medley by Israel Kamakawiwoʻole
"Wonderful World!!", a song by Kanjani8 from 8 Uppers
 "Wonderful World" (James Morrison song)
 "Wonderful World" (Cliff Richard song), a song also recorded by Elvis Presley
 "Wonderful World", a song by Phil Sawyer performing as Beautiful World from In Existence
 "Wonderful World", a song by Tesla from Bust a Nut
 "Wonderful World", a song by Nine Horses from Snow Borne Sorrow
 "What a Wonderful World", a song by Axwell and Bob Sinclar, featuring Ron Carroll

Other uses
 Wonderful World (2009 film), a film starring Matthew Broderick
 Wonderful World (2010 film), a Japanese film
 What a Wonderful World (film), 2014 Moldovan film
 What a Wonderful World!, a manga series by Inio Asano
 Wonderful World (TV series), an Australian television series

See also
 It's a Wonderful World (disambiguation)
 Wonderful World, Beautiful People, an album by Jimmy Cliff